The green hairstreak (Callophrys rubi) is a small butterfly in the family Lycaenidae.

Etymology

The genus name Callophrys is a Greek word meaning "beautiful eyebrows", while the species Latin name rubi derives from Rubus (bramble), one of the host plants.

Subspecies
Callophrys rubi rubi Europe, Caucasus, Kopet Dag 
Callophrys rubi fervida Staudinger, 1901 Iberian Peninsula, Morocco, Asia Minor 
Callophrys rubi  borealis Krulikovsky, 1890 Urals 
Callophrys rubi sibirica Heyne, [1895] Tien-Shan, Altai, Siberia, Transbaikalia, Far East, Amur, Ussuri and Sakhalin.

Description
The oversides of the wings are a uniform dull brown, with two paler patches on the male's forewings made up of scent scales. The undersides are a bright green with a thin white line, often reduced to a faint row of dots or even missing altogether. The iridescent green colour of the undersides is a structural colour caused by diffraction and interference of light by microscopic repeating structures forming a diffraction grating in the wing scales. The caterpillars are green with yellow markings along the back. Like other members of the family they are rather sluglike.

Life cycle and behavior

 
These butterflies can be found at the end of March, with flight time usually lasting until the end of June, but they are sometimes seen in July and early August. They never rest with their wings open, to maintain their green camouflage. The males exhibit territorial behavior.

The eggs are laid singly. The caterpillars are not known to be tended by ants, unlike some lycid larvae, but the pupae, which are formed at ground level, emit squeaks that attract ants and it is thought that ants will always bury any that are found. Green hairstreaks overwinter as pupae and are univoltine, having one generation of adult butterflies per year.

The larva is recorded as feeding on Vaccinium myrtillus, Vaccinum uliginosum, Betula, Rubus idaeus, Vicia cracca, Trifolium medium, Calluna vulgaris, Frangula, Rhamnus, Ribes, Spiraea, Caragana, Chamaecytisus, Hedysarum, Genista, Trifolium  and Hippophae rhamnoides in different parts of its range.

This polyphagous species probably has one of the largest range of food plants of any British butterfly. Early butterfly collectors thought that the only food plant was bramble (blackberry) Rubus fruticosus but as its habits became better understood the list grew and will probably continue to do so. Depending on the habitat it will use common rock rose Helianthemum nummularium, bird's-foot trefoil Lotus corniculatus, gorse Ulex europaeus, broom Cytisus scoparius, Dyer's greenweed Genista tinctoria, bilberry Vaccinium myrtillus, dogwood Cornus sanguinea, buckthorn Rhamnus cathartica, cross-leaved heath Erica tetralix and bramble.

Habitat
The wide range of food plants means that this butterfly is able to use a wide range of habitats including chalk downland, heathland, moorland and clearings in woodland.

Distribution
Callophrys rubi is found in most of Europe, North Africa, Russia, Asia Minor, Siberia, Amurland, Baluchistan and Chitral. It is still widespread across most of the UK, although many colonies have been lost in recent years. In Mediterranean countries it is quite localised and it is usually found near the coasts.

See also

List of butterflies of Great Britain

References

Lepiforum.de
Papillon-poitou-charentes

Callophrys
Butterflies of Africa
Butterflies of Asia
Butterflies of Europe
Butterflies described in 1758
Taxa named by Carl Linnaeus